Choi Sung-jae (born 18 July 1984) is a South Korean actor.

Filmography

Television series

Film

Awards and nominations

References

External links 
 
 

1984 births
Living people
South Korean male television actors
South Korean male film actors